was a Japanese author and rakugo performer of the late Edo and early Meiji eras.

External links
 Texts of Encho's works at Aozora Bunko.
 

1839 births
1900 deaths
19th-century Japanese writers
Theatre in Japan
Rakugoka
Japanese male writers
19th-century male writers
19th-century storytellers
19th-century comedians